The George W. Tillery House is a historic mansion in Pulaski, Tennessee, U.S..

History
The land was purchased by George W. Tillery, a carpenter from South Carolina, in 1838. He built the house in 1840. It was designed in the Greek Revival architectural style. Tillery lived in the house until 1869.

The house has been listed on the National Register of Historic Places since July 5, 1985.

References

Houses on the National Register of Historic Places in Tennessee
Greek Revival houses in Tennessee
Houses completed in 1840
Antebellum architecture
Houses in Giles County, Tennessee